Holidays with Pay Convention (Revised), 1970 is  an International Labour Organization Convention.

It was established in 1970:
Having decided upon the adoption of certain proposals with regard to holidays with pay,...

Provision
The central provision of the convention is found in Article 3, which states that people to whom the convention applies shall be entitled to an annual paid holiday of a specified minimum length, and that although the ratifying state may select the length of the minimum holiday, it "shall in no case be less than three working weeks for one year of service".

Modification 
This Convention revised Convention C52 – Holidays with Pay Convention, 1936.

Ratifications
As of 2020, the convention has been ratified by 38 states.

External links 
Text.
Ratifications.

Employee benefits
International Labour Organization conventions
Leave of absence
Holidays
Treaties concluded in 1970
Treaties entered into force in 1973
Treaties of Armenia
Treaties of Azerbaijan
Treaties of Belarus
Treaties of Belgium
Treaties of Bosnia and Herzegovina
Treaties of Brazil
Treaties of Burkina Faso
Treaties of Cameroon
Treaties of Chad
Treaties of Croatia
Treaties of the Czech Republic
Treaties of Finland
Treaties of West Germany
Treaties of Guinea
Treaties of Hungary
Treaties of Ba'athist Iraq
Treaties of Italy
Treaties of Kenya
Treaties of Latvia
Treaties of Luxembourg
Treaties of North Macedonia
Treaties of Madagascar
Treaties of Malta
Treaties of Montenegro
Treaties of Norway
Treaties of Portugal
Treaties of Russia
Treaties of Rwanda
Treaties of Serbia and Montenegro
Treaties of Slovenia
Treaties of Francoist Spain
Treaties of Sweden
Treaties of Switzerland
Treaties of Ukraine
Treaties of Uruguay
Treaties of the Yemen Arab Republic
Treaties of Ireland
Treaties of Moldova
1970 in labor relations